The following is a list of history podcasts.

List

See also 
 Popular history

References

External links 
 History podcasts on Podchaser
 History podcasts on Player.fm

history

Podcasts